The Graveyard of the Living (German: Der Friedhof der Lebenden) is a 1921 German silent film directed by Gerhard Lamprecht and starring Guido Herzfeld and Hanni Weisse.

The film's sets were designed by the art director Otto Moldenhauer.

Cast
Wilhelm Diegelmann
Eva Düren
Eve Düren
Peter Esser
Ernst Gronau
Paul Günther
Karl Hannemann
Guido Herzfeld
Gerhard Lamprecht
Max Nemetz
Walter Redlich
Frida Richard
Fritz Richard
Gustav Roos
Eduard Rothauser
Wilhelm Völcker
Hanni Weisse
Aribert Wäscher

References

External links

Films of the Weimar Republic
Films directed by Gerhard Lamprecht
German silent feature films
German black-and-white films